"No One Knows" is a song written by Ernie Maresca and Ken Hechet and performed by Dion and the Belmonts.  The song reached number 12 on the R&B chart and number 19 on the Billboard Hot 100 in 1958.  It was featured on their 1958 album, Presenting Dion and the Belmonts.

Other versions
Marty Wilde released a version of the song as a single in November 1958.
Mike LeRoy released a version of the song as the B-side to his single "I Forgot What It Was Like" in October 1964.

In media 
Dion and the Belmonts version was featured in the 1997 movie, The Butcher Boy, and featured on the soundtrack.

References

1958 songs
1958 singles
Songs written by Ernie Maresca
Dion DiMucci songs
Philips Records singles
Columbia Records singles
Laurie Records singles